Claude Stin (15 May 1922 – 13 December 2007) was a Russian–French artist born in Tyumen, Russia. He spent his childhood in Western Siberia where he studied nature during and after school, resulting  in several hundred drawings. He audited classes at the Imperial Academy of Arts in Saint Petersburg. After considerable European travel, he arrived in Paris, where he experimented with a number of alternative painting styles. After 1964, he concentrated on painting wildlife pictures.

Claude sold few paintings in his lifetime, passing the bulk of his legacy to his offspring.

References

External links
 List of Works
 Artist profile
 Quotes

1922 births
2007 deaths
20th-century Russian painters
Russian male painters
Modern painters
Soviet emigrants to France
20th-century Russian male artists